Roshan Lal Verma is an Indian politician and a member of the Seventeenth Legislative Assembly of Uttar Pradesh in India. He represents the Tilhar constituency of Uttar Pradesh and is a member of the Samajwadi Party.

Early life and education

Roshan Lal Verma was born in Shahjahanpur district. He attended the Adarsh School and is educated till eighth grade.

Political career
Roshan Lal Verma has been a MLA for three term. He represented the Tilhar constituency and was a member of the  political party, Bahujan Samaj Party. Later he joined Bhartiya Janta Party until 2021. 

In 2022 he joined Samajwadi Party.

Members of Legislative Assembly 
He was elected in 2007 as  Member, 15th Legislative Assembly of Uttar Pradesh. And re-elected in 2012 for 16th Legislative Assembly of Uttar Pradesh and again in 2017 as Member, 17th Legislative Assembly

Electoral performance

See also
 Tilhar (Assembly constituency)
 Sixteenth Legislative Assembly of Uttar Pradesh
 Uttar Pradesh Legislative Assembly

References 

Former members of Bahujan Samaj Party
Uttar Pradesh MLAs 2012–2017
Uttar Pradesh MLAs 2017–2022
People from Shahjahanpur district
1963 births
Living people
Samajwadi Party politicians from Uttar Pradesh
Former members of Bharatiya Janata Party from Uttar Pradesh